The Hill of Witches is an outdoor sculpture gallery near Juodkrantė, Lithuania. 

It is located on a forested sand dune about 0.5 kilometer west of the Curonian Lagoon, on the Lithuanian Seaside Cycle Route. Begun in 1979, it has been expanded several times, and now contains about 80 wooden sculptures along with a series of trails. The artists drew on a long tradition of woodcarving in Samogitia, and on the equally long tradition of Joninės celebrations on the hill. The pieces depict characters from Lithuanian folklore and pagan traditions. 

Woodcarving symposia are held at the park on a regular basis, and new works are added. Admission is free.

References
 Neringa County Website

External links

 Description
 Lithuanian Seaside Cycle Route

Sculpture gardens, trails and parks in Europe
Landmarks in Lithuania
Lithuanian folk art